Alberite de San Juan is a municipality located in the province of Zaragoza, Aragon, Spain. According to the 2004 census (INE), the municipality has a population of 102 inhabitants. According to the Alberite de San Juan website, the population has since decreased.

References

Municipalities in the Province of Zaragoza